Jonathan Tyler "Ty" Kyte (born July 24, 1984) is a Canadian actor and musician. He was born in Lindsay, Ontario, and began his acting career with commercials and performing in the Musical Tommy in Toronto.  Kyte was made famous amongst Canadian youth as a correspondent on the Canadian TV series Popular Mechanics for Kids alongside fellow Canadians Elisha Cuthbert, Vanessa Lengies and Jay Baruchel. He later appeared on the TV series Goosebumps (1997) and Are You Afraid of the Dark? (1999). 
He appeared in the made-for-TV movie Prom Queen: The Marc Hall Story in 2004, and had a recurring role on the Canadian drama Instant Star as Vincent Spiederman until 2008.

Music

Kyte has released an EP, titled the Let's Talk EP. The EP has 5 original songs, written and performed by Tyler Kyte. Kyte played a rockstar on the show Instant Star (for 4 seasons) where he was the guitarist for the backup band for Jude Harrison (Alexz Johnson). In the show, he performs a different version of the song from his EP, "What You Need" (there are three versions: the original demo, the Let's Talk EP/Instant Star version, and the Talking Pictures version). The song is on the Songs From Instant Star Three soundtrack, along with two songs that were performed by Johnson on the show. Due to Johnson's management at the time, they were not put on the soundtrack. Instead, Kyte recorded the two songs and they were put on the soundtrack. The two songs are "Unraveling" and "Worth Waiting For".  Tyler also performs a song, "Remind Yourself", on the fourth season of Instant Star, which is featured on the soundtrack, Songs From Instant Star Four. As well as singing an acoustic cover of the Degrassi: the Next Generation theme during the ending credits of season 9 And 10

Tyler's debut CD, Talking Pictures, is now available in stores throughout Canada. It was released in both the Canadian and American iTunes stores. Some of the songs from the Let's Talk EP have been remastered for the CD.

He is also currently playing in the band Blue Fox (with Nick Rose and Ryan O'Reilly), and in the band Sweet Thing (with Owen Carrier, Nick Rose, Alex Winter, and Morgan Waters). Tyler also toured throughout Europe with The Ryan O'Reilly Band. He plays guitar, mandolin, and piano as well as providing backing vocals in Blue Fox, The Ryan O'Reilly Band and the drums for Sweet Thing. Tyler plays with an ensemble collective called Dwayne Gretzky featuring a wide variety of covers, sometimes playing theme nights.

Discography
Let's Talk EP (Lefthook Entertainment, 2006)
This EP has 5 original songs, written and performed by Tyler Kyte.

Sweet Thing EP (indie, 2006)
Kyte recorded drums on the 5 songs.

Don't Feel Cold (Questionable Records, 2006)
Kyte cowrote and recorded 1 song ("Making You Happy") w/ Ryan O'Reilly.

Songs From Instant Star Three (Orange Record Label, 2006–2007)
This soundtrack has 3 songs performed by Kyte, including a song from his EP "What You Need".

Blue Fox EP (Canterbury Music, 2007)
Kyte cowrote and recorded backing vocals, guitar, and piano for these 5 songs.

The Cloverhill EP (Rogue Studio, 2008)
EP by Nick Rose.

Songs From Instant Star Four (Orange Record Label, 2008)
This soundtrack has 1 song ("Remind Yourself") performed by Kyte.

Talking Pictures (Orange Record Label, 2008)
The debut solo album for Kyte, includes 10 tracks.

Sweet Thing (EMI Canada, 2010)
Kyte cowrote 3 tracks and recorded drums and backing vocals

Tyler Kyte and the Nice Guys 2014

Acting

 Young roles 
Tyler Kyte played many roles during his younger years. Roles include Goosebumps, Popular Mechanics for Kids, Due South, The Defenders: Payback, Are You Afraid of the Dark, Interstate 60, Darcy's Wild life, and more. Kyte's first role was in Goosebumps' "Don't Go To Sleep" as Matt Amsterdam, a boy tired of being young who, after sleeping in his attic one night, wakes up in another dimension. In 1998, Kyte landed a role in the popular children's show replacing Jay Baruchel, Popular Mechanics for Kids. His co-stars included Elisha Cuthbert and Vanessa Lengies. His role in PMK landed him a nomination in 2001 at the Geminis, "Best Performance in a Children's or Youth Program or Series". Certain episode were released on DVD.

 Adult roles 
In 2003, Tyler played Charles Smart in the movie The Elizabeth Smart Story. The movie is based on the true story of Elizabeth Smart's kidnapping. Later in 2004, Kyte took a role in a popular gay-themed movie, Prom Queen: The Marc Hall Story''.

Credits

Television

External links

1984 births
Living people
21st-century Canadian male actors
Canadian male child actors
Canadian male television actors
Canadian pop singers
Male actors from Ontario
Musicians from Ontario
People from Kawartha Lakes
21st-century Canadian male singers